thumb|Château de Clavières 
  
The Château de  Clavières was a château in Ayrens, a commune in the Cantal département in the Auvergne region of France.

History
The Château de Clavières burnt down on 25 May 1936 and was left in ruins, which after the recent sale of the site are no longer accessible. It was owned in the 19th and early 20th centuries by the Duc de la Salle de Rochemaure, a félibrige writer.

Notes

External links
  Château de Clavières
  Félibrée de Sceaux dimanche 3 juin 2007 intervention de Roger Vidal

Châteaux in Cantal
Ruined castles in Auvergne-Rhône-Alpes
Gothic Revival architecture in France
Former castles in France